The 2006 CFU Club Championship is the annual international football club competition held in the Caribbean Football Union/CFU region (Caribbean). The Caribbean Tournament Champion will qualify to the 2007 CONCACAF Champions Cup. The CFU changed the home-away format for this tournament to four group stages at Caribbean sites.  Fourteen teams will compete for the Caribbean berth to the CONCACAF Champions' Cup.

The first round of the 2006 Caribbean Football Union Tournament consisted of two groups of four teams along with two triangulars which took place between November 30 and December 14, 2006.

The first round group winners advanced to the semifinals, to be completed before January 26, 2007, at a venue of one of the semifinalist clubs. No Clubs Enter in Suriname,  Walking Bout Company and  SV Robinhood.

First round

Groups A and B took place in Jamaica, while Puerto Rico and US Virgin Islands hosted Groups C and D respectively.

Group A

Group B

Group C

Group D

Semifinals
 Harbour View qualified from Group A. 
 Baltimore SC qualified from Group B. 
 W Connection qualified from Group C. 
 San Juan Jabloteh qualified from Group D.

Final

External links
 Information from CONCACAF official site

Notes

2006-07
1